Giovanni Gradenigo (died 8 August 1356) was the fifty-sixth Doge of Venice, appointed on 21 April 1355. During his reign, Venice signed a peace treaty with Genoa.

Biography
Gradenigo was born in Venice. He was married to Adriana Borromeo and then to Marina Capello. Before his election, he had been podestà in Capodistria, Padua, and Treviso. His recognized loyalty to the Venetian Republic probably helped him in being elected, as he came after the conjure which had led to the execution of his predecessor, Marino Faliero.

Two months after his election, the Venetians signed a peace treaty with Genoa, ending a long and unfavorable war. During his reign, measures were taken to improve the Republic's economic situation, but in 1356, they were again in war both on the mainland and in Dalmatia (which would end in the unfavorable Treaty of Zadar under his successor, Giovanni Dolfin).

He died in August 1356.

References

13th-century births
1356 deaths
14th-century Doges of Venice